Lafont is a Southern French surname. It may refer to:

Alban Lafont (born 1999), Burkinabé-born French footballer
Bernadette Lafont (1938–2013), French actress and the mother of Pauline Lafont
Bruno Lafont (born 1956), French businessman
Charles Philippe Lafont (1781–1839), French violinist and composer
Cristina Lafont, American philosopher
Dominique Lafont (born 1961), French  businessperson
Emmanuel Marie Philippe Louis Lafont (born 1945), Roman Catholic bishop of the Diocese of Cayenne in French Guiana since 2004
Ernest Lafont (1879–1946), French socialist politician
Eugène Lafont (1837–1908), Belgian Jesuit, Missionary in Bengal, scientist and founder of the first Scientific Society in India
Henri Lafont (1902–1944), the head of the French Gestapo during the German occupation in World War II
Jean-Philippe Lafont (born 1951), French baritone
Louis Charles Georges Jules Lafont (1825–1908), French naval officer, Governor of Cochinchina from 1877 to 1879
Marcelle Lafont (1905-1982) chemist, chemical engineer, member of the French Resistance and politician.
Marie-Zélia Lafont (born 1987), French Olympic canoeist 
Maurice Lafont (1927–2005), French football (soccer) defender
Pauline Lafont (1963–1988), French actress
Pierre-Chéri Lafont (1797–1873), French actor born at Bordeaux
Robèrt Lafont (born 1923), Occitan intellectual from Provence – linguist, author, historian, expert in literature, political theoretician
Sophie de Lafont (1717–1797), Russian educator

See also

 Laffont (disambiguation)
 Fontaine (disambiguation)
 Font (disambiguation)
 

Occitan-language surnames